The San Francisco Mint is a branch of the United States Mint. Opened in 1854 to serve the gold mines of the California Gold Rush, in twenty years its operations exceeded the capacity of the first building. It moved into a new one in 1874, now known as the Old San Francisco Mint. In 1937 Mint operations moved into a third building, the current one, completed that year.

History

Original United States Mint and Subtreasury (1854) 

The San Francisco Mint began operations in 1854 at 608 Commercial Street, just west of Montgomery Street. The building sat between Commercial and Clay Streets and a historical plaque can be found today on Commercial. Since June 14, 1970, the building has been listed as a San Francisco Designated Landmark.   

Within the first year of its operation, the San Francisco mint turned $4 million in gold bullion into coins. Because of the scale of its increase in operations due to economic growth, a new building was soon required.  

Construction of the new location approximately 1 mile away began in 1869 at Fifth Street and Mission Street. The mint operations moved to that building in 1874.

Old San Francisco Mint (1874) 
See more: Old San Francisco Mint

The second US Mint building here, completed in 1874 for the Department of the Treasury, was designed by Alfred B. Mullett in a conservative Greek Revival style with a sober Doric order. The columns and most of the exterior and upper floors was constructed of sandstone. It was quarried at Newcastle Island, British Columbia, near the city of Nanaimo and imported for this purpose. 

The building had a central pedimented portico flanked by projecting wings in an E-shape; it was built around a completely enclosed central courtyard that contained a well. These features saved it during the fire of 1906 that followed the San Francisco Earthquake, when the heat melted the plate glass windows and exploded sandstone and granite blocks with which it was faced. The building is  based on a concrete and granite foundation, designed to thwart tunneling into its vaults. At the time of the 1906, the Mint held $300 million, fully a third of the United States' gold reserves. Efforts by Superintendent of the Mint, Frank A. Leach, and his men preserved the building and the bullion that backed the nation's currency.  The mint resumed operation soon thereafter, continuing until 1937 at this site. 

Now known as the Old San Francisco Mint, it was designated as a National Historic Landmark in 1961 and sold to the city of San Francisco in 2003. There are plans for adaptive reuse, including as a museum, and continued special events space.

Current building 
The new Mint was opened in 1937. Beginning in 1955, circulating coinage from San Francisco was suspended for 13 years. In 1968, this facility took over most proof coinage production from the Philadelphia Mint, but continued striking a supplemental circulating coinage from 1968 through 1974. 

Since 1975, the San Francisco Mint has been used almost exclusively for proof coinage, with the exception of the Susan B. Anthony dollar from 1979–81, a portion of the mintage of cents in the early 1980s, and circulation-strike America the Beautiful quarters marked with an "S" mintmark and issued only for collectors since 2012. The dollars and quarters bear a mintmark of an "S", but the cents are otherwise indistinguishable from those minted at Philadelphia (which bear no mintmarks, unlike those years' proof cents from San Francisco and circulation cents from Denver).

From 1962 to 1988, the San Francisco Mint was officially an assay office; the San Francisco Assay Office was granted mint status again on March 31, 1988. The San Francisco Mint is located at 155 Hermann Street. It admits visitors only as a rare exception. On May 15, 1987, to commemorate the 50th anniversary of the Mint, a limited number of people were allowed to tour the facility. This tour was advertised in the San Francisco Chronicle newspaper, with reservations required.

Commemoratives

San Francisco Old Mint Gold 
In 2006, the United States Mint released a gold five dollar commemorative coin which commemorates the 100th year after the old San Francisco mint survived an earthquake.
The mint also played a part in the city's recovery after the earthquake, providing shelter for many as it was one of the few buildings left standing.

The coin was minted as both a proof coin and an uncirculated coin, and is no longer available directly from the United States Mint. On June 15, 2006, President George W. Bush signed Public Law 109-230, legislation authorizing the production of the 2006 San Francisco $5 commemorative gold coin as well as its $1 silver counterpart. The production of the $5 denomination was limited to a maximum mintage of 100,000 coins, but separate mintage figures for each of the proof and uncirculated coins have not yet been released. The $1 silver version was limited to only 500,000 coins, both in proof and uncirculated products, but distinct mintage figures for both products has not been officially stated.

The reverse was designed by Christian Gobrecht and sculpted by Joseph Menna.

Features
Coin Finishes: proof, and uncirculated
Maximum Mintage: 100,000 -  The final mintages were 16,938 uncirculated, and 47,275 proof.
United States Mint Facility: San Francisco (S)
Public Law: 109-230

San Francisco Old Mint Silver

In 2006, the United States Mint released a silver dollar commemorative coin which commemorates the 100th anniversary of the survival of the Old San Francisco Mint in the 1906 San Francisco earthquake. The Mint also played a part in the city's recovery after the earthquake.

The coin was sold both as a proof coin and an uncirculated coin, with a maximum coinage of 500,000 coins.

Features
This coin has a design of the Old San Francisco Mint on the obverse and a replica of the 1904 eagle design on the reverse.

Coin finishes: proof, and uncirculated
Maximum Mintage: 500,000 (at the time)
United States Mint Facility: San Francisco (s)
Public Law: 109-230

See also

 List of Mints
 Historical United States mints
 List of San Francisco Designated Landmarks

References

External links

Official San Francisco Mint website
"US Mint Buildings Across the Nation: San Francisco Mint", US Treasury Department website, 2007.
"New San Francisco Mint" article (1936)
Michael Castleman, "Grace Under fire", Smithsonian Magazine April 2006, pp 56ff Mint Superintendent Frank Leach and his men saved the mint during the San Francisco fire, 1906.
"The Second US Mint at San Francisco: Part One" Article
General Services Administration page on the Old Mint, San Francisco

United States Mint
Mints of the United States
Government buildings in San Francisco
California Gold Rush
Government agencies established in 1854
Manufacturing plants in the United States
South of Market, San Francisco
Western Addition, San Francisco
Government buildings on the National Register of Historic Places in San Francisco
San Francisco Designated Landmarks
1874 in California
Government buildings completed in 1874
1870s architecture in the United States
Neoclassical architecture in California
1937 in California
Government buildings completed in 1937
1930s architecture in the United States
Moderne architecture in California
Stripped Classical architecture in the United States
1854 establishments in California